Kush Kumar, (born May 29, 1996 in Dhampur) is a professional squash player who represents India. Kush Kumar graduated with a finance degree Trinity College. Kumar now works for a hedgefund called Matrix Capital Management based in Boston. He reached a career-high world ranking of World No. 89 in August 2015. He became popular when his Men's Squash Team won Gold Medal in 2014 Asian Games along with Harinder Pal Sandhu, Mahesh Mangaonkar, Saurav Ghosal. He is the only male player from India to have gotten a medal in the World Junior Championship and he has been junior national champion 9 times. Trinity Bantams On February 27, 2018, Kumar's team captured the collegiate squash national title against Harvard, with Kumar winning his match against Harvard's No. 1. On March 4, 2018, the top-seeded Kumar placed second in the CSA Individual National Championship, falling 3-2 to the fourteenth-seeded David Ryan of Harvard, who had only gained entry to the tournament after the withdrawals of several higher-ranked players. After battling back from 2-0 down (11-4, 11-8) to even the match at 2-2 (7-11, 3-11), Kumar failed to capitalize on two match balls at 10-8, eventually losing 12-10.

References

External links 

Indian male squash players
Living people
1996 births
Asian Games medalists in squash
Squash players at the 2014 Asian Games
Asian Games gold medalists for India
Medalists at the 2014 Asian Games
Trinity Bantams men's squash players